The men's 20 kilometres walk event at the 2017 European Athletics U23 Championships was held in Bydgoszcz, Poland, at Zdzisław Krzyszkowiak Stadium on 16 July.

Results

References

20 kilometres walk
Racewalking at the European Athletics U23 Championships